The Body Shocking Show is a factual series shown on E4 with the first episode being aired on 14 March 2013 at 10pm.

Episodes

References

External links

2013 British television series debuts
2013 British television series endings
English-language television shows
E4 (TV channel) original programming